Københavns Teater (lit. English:Theatre of Copenhagen), often referred to as kbht,, is a self-owning organization under the Danish Ministry of Culture responsible for sponsoring and managing a number of theatres in the Greater Copenhagen area. The theaters within the organization  are managed by a board that decides which venues should be offered. The members of the Board of Directors are appointed from among persons affiliated with the acting industry.

Theatres
Theatres managed by the organization include:
 Betty Nansen Teatret
 Teater Republique 
 Folketeatret
 Østre Gasværk Teater
 Nørrebros Theater

Additionally Det Ny Teater receives a rent subsidy  and the Danish Dance Theatre is provided a special grant.

References

External links
 Københavns Teater Official website

Theatres in Copenhagen
Organizations based in Copenhagen